Konovalovskaya is a rural locality (a village) in Osinovskoye Rural Settlement of Vinogradovsky District, Arkhangelsk Oblast, Russia. The population was 3 as of 2010.

Geography 
Konovalovskaya is located on the Severnaya Dvina River, 64 km southeast of Bereznik (the district's administrative centre) by road. Maslovskaya is the nearest rural locality.

References 

Rural localities in Vinogradovsky District